The Copa Alagipe  is a football regional tournament organized by the Brazilian states of Alagoas and Sergipe. It had the first edition in 2005, being held again from 2022.

History

The 2005 edition was used as a qualification for 2006 Campeonato Brasileiro Série C. The return of the tournament in 2022 aims to replace the function of the state cups, moving the team from the states that are culturally close and find it difficult to compete in the main regional competition, the Copa do Nordeste.

List of champions

References

Football cup competitions in Brazil
Football in Alagoas
Football in Sergipe